Eq. Tower is a residential building in Melbourne, Victoria, Australia.

The skyscraper is developed by ICD Property group in conjunction with Sino-Ocean Land and designed by architect Elenberg Fraser. Launched in 2013, the project received approval by the then-Planning Minister Matthew Guy in February, 2014. Designed to accommodate 633 apartment dwellings, the residential skyscraper reaches a height of 202.7 metres (665 feet) and comprises 63 floors.

Construction on Eq. commenced in February 2015, before topping-out in October 2016. The project was scheduled to be completed by June 2017; it was completed a month early in May of that year. It is one of the tallest buildings in Melbourne.

See also

 List of tallest buildings in Melbourne

References

External links

Skyscrapers in Melbourne
Residential skyscrapers in Australia
Apartment buildings in Melbourne
Residential buildings completed in 2017
2017 establishments in Australia
Buildings and structures in Melbourne City Centre